SIB Fixed Cost Reduction is a privately owned business consulting firm specializing in expense auditing and fixed cost reduction. SIB was founded in 2008 and is headquartered in Charleston, South Carolina. SIB stands for "Solutions Integrated Business."

History

SIB was founded in November 2008 by entrepreneur Dan Schneider just weeks after the financial crisis which led to the Great Recession. SIB grew steadily with estimated revenues of $2 million in 2010 and $6 million in 2011, while continuously hiring to keep pace with growth. Schneider has said that the recession played a role in SIB's successful start, since the company offered a way for other businesses to make up for lost revenue.

In 2013 SIB moved to a newly renovated 10,400-square-foot headquarters building in the upper peninsula area of Charleston. This facility is expected to allow SIB to eventually grow to up to 100 employees. Kevin Flounders was named CEO of SIB Fixed Cost Control in November 2018. SIB merged with Cost Control Associates, a utility expense management firm, in September 2020.

Services and business model

SIB reviews businesses' fixed monthly costs and makes recommendations for cost savings. These include utilities, waste removal, telecom, uniforms and laundry services, treasury and bank fees, and property taxes. Most work is done on a contingency basis.

SIB's client base comprises businesses with multiple locations such as grocery, retail and hotel chains, auto dealerships, hospital and medical groups, banks, senior living homes, and manufacturers.

Company culture

SIB promotes an upbeat and informal office culture. One longstanding company policy mandates that, rather than facing more traditional disciplinary action, any employee who makes a significant mistake must instead buy ice cream for co-workers. This practice draws enough attention to the offender to discourage future errors while addressing transgressions in a more positive manner.

SIB has policies to promote work-life balance and workplace wellness. The company provides its employees with a free, healthy lunch cooked by an in-house chef every work day. The company also allows employees to bring their dogs to work. SIB designed its Charleston headquarters facility to include an employee gym, outdoor pet area, outdoor meeting space and natural light throughout the building.

Retention bonus

SIB attracted national media attention in 2011 for their policy of awarding retention bonuses in the form of $50,000 lump-sum payments to any employee who remains with the company for at least five years. The bonus is awarded regardless of job title or salary and is renewable for every five-year interval the employee remains employed by SIB.

Schneider enacted the retention bonus policy to incentivize and reward company loyalty. It also reduces the expenses and inefficiency associated with employee turnover or job-searching while on the clock. He also liked the idea of awarding a single, large lump sum payment to maximize the impact on SIB employees' lives.

References

External links
 

Consulting firms established in 2008
Companies based in South Carolina